The 92 Club is a groundhopping society, in order to be a member of which a person must attend an association football game at the stadium of every current Premier League and EFL Championship, EFL League One, EFL League Two club in England and Wales.

 
The 'club' takes its name from the fact that there are 92 teams in the English professional league tier. The list of stadiums changes each year, as clubs are promoted and relegated in and out of the EFL, and other clubs move to new stadiums.

The 92 Club was founded in 1978 by Bristol Rovers F.C. supporter Gordon Pearce.

List of 92 Club Stadiums in 2022-23 season

Premier League 

 Emirates Stadium (Arsenal)
 Villa Park (Aston Villa)
 Dean Court (AFC Bournemouth)
 Brentford Community Stadium (Brentford)
 Falmer Stadium (Brighton & Hove Albion)
 Stamford Bridge (Chelsea)
 Selhurst Park (Crystal Palace)
 Goodison Park (Everton)
 Craven Cottage (Fulham)
 Elland Road (Leeds United)
 King Power Stadium (Leicester City)
 Anfield (Liverpool)
 City of Manchester Stadium (Manchester City)
 Old Trafford (Manchester United)
 St James' Park (Newcastle United)
 City Ground (Nottingham Forest)
 St Mary's Stadium (Southampton)
 Tottenham Hotspur Stadium (Tottenham Hotspur)
 London Stadium (West Ham United)
 Molineux Stadium (Wolverhampton Wanderers)

EFL Championship 

 St Andrew's (Birmingham City)
 Ewood Park (Blackburn Rovers)
 Bloomfield Road (Blackpool)
 Ashton Gate Stadium (Bristol City)
 Turf Moor (Burnley)
 Cardiff City Stadium (Cardiff City)
 Coventry Building Society Arena (Coventry City)
 John Smith's Stadium (Huddersfield Town)
 MKM Stadium (Hull City)
 Kenilworth Road (Luton Town)
 Riverside Stadium (Middlesbrough)
 The Den (Millwall)
 Carrow Road (Norwich City)
 Deepdale (Preston North End)
 Loftus Road (Queens Park Rangers)

 Madejski Stadium (Reading)
 New York Stadium (Rotherham United)
 Bramall Lane (Sheffield United)
 bet365 Stadium (Stoke City)
 Stadium of Light (Sunderland)
 Swansea.com Stadium (Swansea City)
 Vicarage Road (Watford)
 The Hawthorns (West Bromwich Albion)
 DW Stadium (Wigan Athletic)

EFL League One 

 Crown Ground (Accrington Stanley)
 Oakwell (Barnsley)
 University of Bolton Stadium (Bolton Wanderers)
 Memorial Stadium (Bristol Rovers)
 Pirelli Stadium (Burton Albion)
 Abbey Stadium (Cambridge United)
 The Valley (Charlton Athletic)
 Whaddon Road (Cheltenham Town)
 Pride Park Stadium (Derby County)
 St. James Park (Exeter City)
 Highbury Stadium (Fleetwood Town)
 The New Lawn (Forest Green Rovers)
 Portman Road (Ipswich Town)
 Sincil Bank (Lincoln City)
 Stadium MK (Milton Keynes Dons)
 Globe Arena (Morecambe)
 Kassam Stadium (Oxford United)
 London Road Stadium (Peterborough United)
 Home Park (Plymouth Argyle)
 Fratton Park (Portsmouth)
 Vale Park (Port Vale)
 Hillsborough Stadium (Sheffield Wednesday)
 New Meadow (Shrewsbury Town)
 Adams Park (Wycombe Wanderers)

EFL League Two 

 Plough Lane (AFC Wimbledon)
 Holker Street (Barrow)
 Valley Parade (Bradford City)
 Brunton Park (Carlisle United)
 Colchester Community Stadium (Colchester United)
 Broadfield Stadium (Crawley Town)
 Gresty Road (Crewe Alexandra)
 Keepmoat Stadium (Doncaster Rovers)
 Priestfield Stadium (Gillingham)
 Blundell Park (Grimsby Town)
 Wetherby Road (Harrogate Town)
 Victoria Park (Hartlepool United)
 Brisbane Road (Leyton Orient)
 Field Mill (Mansfield Town)
 Rodney Parade (Newport County)
 Sixfields Stadium (Northampton Town)
 Spotland Stadium (Rochdale)
 Moor Lane (Salford City)
 Broadhall Way (Stevenage)
 Edgeley Park (Stockport County)
 Gander Green Lane (Sutton United)
 County Ground (Swindon Town)

 Prenton Park (Tranmere Rovers)

 Bescot Stadium (Walsall)

See also
Association football culture
List of English football stadiums by capacity
Groundhopping

References

External links
The 92 Club
http://www.the92.net - unaffiliated (free) website fans can track, rate and find other people who are on the way, or are already part of the 92.
http://www.doingthe92.com - unaffiliated (free) website fans can use to track the grounds they've visited
http://www.footballfans.eu/ Great website for tracking fixtures attended that automatically calculates what grounds you have been to

Football in England